Richard John Charles Hersee ( – 5 May 1922) was a Welsh international footballer. He was part of the Wales national football team, playing 1 match and scoring 1 goal on 27 February 1886 against Ireland. At club level, he played for Llandudno Swifts.

He was the younger brother of Malcolm Hersee.

See also
 List of Wales international footballers (alphabetical)

References

1867 births
1922 deaths
People from Llandudno
Sportspeople from Conwy County Borough
Welsh footballers
Wales international footballers
Association footballers not categorized by position
Llandudno Swifts F.C. players